Helen Jackson may refer to:
 Helen Hunt Jackson (1830–1885), American writer
 Helen M. Gougar or Helen Mar Jackson (1843–1907), American attorney
 Helen Jackson (tennis) (fl. 1895), English tennis player
 Helen Viola Jackson (1919–2020), the last surviving American Civil War widow
 Helen J. Frye or Helen Jackson (1930–2011), American judge
 Helen Jackson (politician) (born 1939), British politician
 Helen Williams (model) or Helen Williams Jackson, American model
 Helen Jackson, sponsor of USS Bremerton (SSN-698)
 Helen Jackson, musician in Brontosaurus Chorus

Fictional 
 Helen Jackson, a character in Son of Ingagi
 Helen Jackson, a Mobile Suit Victory Gundam character